Krzysztof Chrapek (born 7 October  1985 in Czechowice-Dziedzice) is a Polish professional footballer who plays as a forward for Niwa Nowa Wieś.

Career
Chrapek played for Górnik Brzeszcze and LKS Jawiszowice. In 2006, he was transferred to Podbeskidzie Bielsko-Biała. He made his first team debut on March 25 against Śląsk Wrocław and scored his first goal for Podbeskidzie in a victory over KSZO Ostrowiec Świętokrzyski. Chrapek finished the 2005–06 season with fourteen appearances and four goals. During the next seasons Chrapek was a first-choice forward in Podbeskidzie. Until 2009 he made 101 league appearances for that club and scored 29 goals.

On 10 July 2009 he signed a four-year contract with Lech Poznań. On 25 July, he made his debut for Lech in a Polish Super Cup final against Wisła Kraków. In Ekstraklasa, he debuted in a 3–1 away victory over Piast Gliwice.

Honours
Lech Poznań
Ekstraklasa: 2009–10
Polish Super Cup: 2009

References

External links
 

Living people
1985 births
People from Czechowice-Dziedzice
Sportspeople from Silesian Voivodeship
Association football forwards
Polish footballers
Lech Poznań players
Piast Gliwice players
Podbeskidzie Bielsko-Biała players
Ekstraklasa players
I liga players
III liga players
IV liga players